The Essential is a budget greatest hits album by Australian singer-songwriter, James Reyne. The album was released in 2008 and tracks are taken from the albums, James Reyne, Hard Reyne, Electric Digger Dandy.
There are five top 20 singles on the album.

Track listing
 CD/ Cassette (EMI 50999 243070 2 4)
 "Hammerhead" - 4:46
 "Motor's Too Fast" - 4:20	
 "One More River" - 4:01	
 "Fall of Rome" - 4:57
 "Slave" - 4:13
 "Any Day Above Ground" - 3:38
 "Heaven on a Stick" - 3:24	
 "Some People" - 4:14
 "Mr. Sandman" - 4:24
 "Way Out West" (with James Blundell)  - 3:59
 "Rip it Up" - 5:42
 "Always the Way"	- 7:23

External links

References

James Reyne albums
Compilation albums by Australian artists
EMI Records albums
2008 compilation albums